A type proanthocyanidins are a specific type of proanthocyanidins, which are a class of flavonoid. Proanthocyanidins fall under a wide range of names in the nutritional and scientific vernacular, including oligomeric proanthocyanidins, flavonoids, polyphenols, condensed tannins, and OPCs. Proanthocyanidins were first popularized by French scientist Jacques Masquelier.

Distribution in plants 

A-type linkage is a less common feature in proanthocyanidins with both 4β→8 (B-type) and 2β→O→7 interflavanoid bonds.

A-type proanthocyanidin glycosides can be isolated from cocoa liquor.

Dimers 
 Procyanidin A1 is an epicatechin-(2β→7,4β→8)-catechin dimer.
 Procyanidin A2 is a dimeric (-)epicatechin.

Other A-type proanthocyanidins can be found in cranberries, cinnamon, peanut skins and Geranium niveum.

Chemistry 
B-type procyanidins (catechin dimers) can be converted to A-type procyanidins by radical oxidation. Fragmentation patterns for A-type proanthocyanidins include heterocyclic ring fission (HRF), retro-Diels-Alder (RDA) fission, benzofuran-forming fission (BFF) and quinone methide fission (QM).

Metabolism 
The metabolism of type-A proanthocyanidins is significant since a large number of metabolites are detected in urine and feces soon after ingestion of foods rich in polymers, indicating rapid elimination and absence of physiological effect. Polymeric type-A proanthocyanidins are depolymerized into epicatechin units in the small intestine, then cleaved into smaller phenolic acids with no known biological role.

Research
In vitro, A-type proanthocyanidins isolated from cranberry juice cocktail demonstrated anti-adhesion activity against E. coli binding to urinary tract epithelial cells, whereas B-type proanthocyanidins from grape exhibited minor activity. However, in humans, there is no sufficient clinical evidence that cranberry type-A proanthocyanidins are effective in lowering risk of urinary tract infection.

References 

Condensed tannins